"If You..." is a song performed by the Italian singer Magic Box. It was written by Tristano De Bonis, and produced by Rossano Prini and Gianluca Mensi. The single was launched in January 2003 by Spy/Time.

Music video
The music video of "If You..." despite having different special effects, it has good content and sound, first by using Magic Box loving feelings mixed with drum sets and sound echoes.

Track listing 

Digital download
 "If You" – 3:27

Charts

References

2003 songs
2003 singles
Magic Box (singer) songs
English-language Italian songs